The episodes of the Bleach anime television series are based on Tite Kubo's original manga series of the same name. It is directed by Noriyuki Abe, produced by TV Tokyo, Dentsu and Pierrot, and was broadcast in Japan from October 5, 2004, to March 27, 2012. The series follows the adventures of high school student Ichigo Kurosaki who can see spirits and becomes a Soul Reaper, after assuming the duties of Soul Reaper Rukia Kuchiki.

Viz Media obtained the foreign television, home video and merchandising rights to the Bleach anime from TV Tokyo Corporation and Shueisha on March 15, 2006. Subsequently, Viz Media contracted Studiopolis to create the English adaptation of the anime, and has licensed its individual Bleach merchandising rights to several different companies. The English adaptation of the Bleach anime premiered on Canada's YTV in their Bionix programming block on September 9, 2006. Cartoon Network in the U.S. began airing Bleach the following evening on September 10 as part of Adult Swim.

Forty-five pieces of theme music are used for the episodes: Fifteen opening themes and thirty closing themes. Several CDs that contain the theme music and other tracks have been released by Studio Pierrot. As of January 23, 2013, all 366 episodes have been released by Aniplex in Japan in 88 DVD compilations. 32 DVD compilations of the English adaptation of the series have been released by Viz Media, and twenty six season boxsets have been released that contain all the seasons of the anime.

A sequel television series that adapts the final arc of the manga, titled Thousand-Year Blood War, premiered on October 11, 2022.

Series overview

Episode list

Season 1: The Substitute Soul Reaper (2004–05)

Season 2: The Entry (2005)

Season 3: The Rescue (2005–06)

Season 4: The Bount (2006)

Season 5: The Assault (2006–07)

Season 6: Arrancar: The Appearance (2007)

Season 7: The Arrancar Part 2: The Hueco Mundo Sneak Entry (2007)

Season 8: The Arrancar Part 3: The Fierce Fight (2007–08)

Season 9: The New Captain Shūsuke Amagai (2008)

Season 10: The Arrancar Part 4: Arrancar vs Soul Reaper (2008–09)

Season 11: Turn Back The Pendulum (2009)

Season 12: The Arrancar Part 5: Battle in Karakura (2009)

Season 13: Zanpakutō: The Alternate Tale (2009–10)

Season 14: The Arrancar Part 6: Fall of the Espada (2010–11)

Season 15: Gotei 13 Invading Army (2011)

Season 16: The Lost Agent (2011–12)

Thousand-Year Blood War (2022–present)

Specials

Films

DVD releases

Japanese
The 88 DVD compilations of the series are grouped by season and were released in Japan by Aniplex between February 2, 2005 and January 23, 2013.

English
The 32 DVD compilations have been released by Viz Media in the United States. A DVD collection box of the first and final season was released on June 10, 2008 to September 29, 2015. In 2016, Viz started releasing the series on Blu-Ray, with a total of 13 sets planned, cutting the number of DVD sets in half.

The series has been released in the United Kingdom by Manga Entertainment in half-season sets, then re-released into season sets.

Blu-ray releases

Notes

References
General

 
 
 
 
 
 

Specific